James Campbell (17 April 1895 – 6 November 1957) was a Scottish trade union leader.

Born in Glasgow, Campbell worked as a ticket collector for the Glasgow and South Western Railway, and joined the National Union of Railwaymen (NUR) in 1911. During World War I, he served with the Royal Engineers.
 
On his return, Campbell rejoined the railways, and was elected as branch secretary in the NUR. He held a succession of increasingly senior positions in the union, eventually becoming a full-time organiser, then the chief organiser for Ireland, and assistant general secretary.

In 1953, Campbell was elected as general secretary of the NUR, and he was also elected onto the General Council of the Trades Union Congress. While in office, he visited the Soviet Union, with Tom Hollywood and four other union representatives. Just outside Leningrad, the car in which he and Hollywood were travelling was hit by a bus, and both were killed. Campbell was 62.

References

1895 births
1957 deaths
General Secretaries of the National Union of Railwaymen
Members of the General Council of the Trades Union Congress
Trade unionists from Glasgow
British Army personnel of World War I
Royal Engineers soldiers
Road incident deaths in the Soviet Union